Marvin Pourié (born 8 January 1991) is a German professional footballer who plays as a forward for  club SV Meppen.

Club career
Pourié arrived at the Liverpool Academy from Borussia Dortmund in the summer of 2007 and scored 12 goals in his first year with the Under-18s.

Schalke 04 and loans
On 5 January 2009, Pourié transferred back to Germany, signing a contract with first division club Schalke 04. His contract with Schalke was due to end on 30 June 2013.

Immediately after arriving at Schalke he was loaned out to 2. Bundesliga club TSV 1860 Munich until the end of the 2010–11 season.

Schalke general manager Andreas Müller said of the new striker: "Marvin is a talented player who will now get some match practice at a higher level. The aim is for him to find his feet in the professional game and hopefully he’ll come on well. Schalke and 1860 Munich are great clubs with a long tradition. I'm delighted the move has worked out. My aim is to play as many games as possible."

Pourié made his professional debut in a third round 2008–09 DFB-Pokal match for 1860 Munich against Hamburger SV on 27 January 2009. He made his league debut on 22 February 2009, starting in a 4–1 loss in the 2. Bundesliga to MSV Duisburg.

After several undisciplined acts, Pourié was dropped from the squad on 24 April 2009 by then coach Uwe Wolf. When he was then sacked with two games to go and replaced by Ewald Lienen, Pourié returned to the squad, but he did not make it into the 18 players nominated for the remaining matches. On 31 August 2009, he returned on loan to 1860 Munich, but he would only play for the under-19-team in the U-19-Bundesliga. On 27 January 2010, his club 1860 Munich terminated his contract and Pourie returned to Schalke 04. A day later, Schalke loaned him out again, this time to TuS Koblenz.

Silkeborg
In June 2011, Pourié signed a three-year contract with Silkeborg IF and thereby moved to Danish Superliga.

F.C. Copenhagen and loans
In July 2013, Pourié signed a four-year contract with F.C. Copenhagen, after playing for Silkeborg IF for two years.

On 27 January, Pourié came to a loan agreement with Belgian Pro League side S.V. Zulte Waregem, joining until the summer 2014. He made his debut for Zulte Waregem on 29 January, scoring the only goal in a cupmatch against KAA Gent

On 21 May 2015, Pourié scored a hat-trick to help SønderjyskE defeat Esbjerg fB 2–3. As his loan spell with SønderjyskE came to an end, he rejoined F.C. Copenhagen in the summer of 2015. He scored two goals away against Newtown and three days later he scored the opening goal of the 2–1 win, away, against Esbjerg fB.

In August 2015 he was loaned again, this time to FC Ufa. He struggled to integrate into the team in the first half of the season, being rotated in and out of the starting XI alongside Haris Handžić and Vyacheslav Krotov.

Karlsruher SC
In January 2018, Pourié returned to Germany, joining Karlsruher SC from Randers FC.

On 21 January 2020, Pourié joined Eintracht Braunschweig on loan for the rest of the 2019–20 season.

In August he moved to 1. FC Kaiserslautern on loan for the 2020–21 season with 1. FC Kaiserslautern securing an option to sign him permanently.

International career
Pourié was a member of the Germany U-18 team, playing nine games and scoring three goals.

Honours
Individual
 3. Liga Player of the Season: 2019–20

References

External links
 
 
 
 Official Danish Superliga stats 

Living people
1991 births
People from Werne
Sportspeople from Arnsberg (region)
Association football forwards
German footballers
Footballers from North Rhine-Westphalia
Belgian Pro League players
Danish Superliga players
2. Bundesliga players
3. Liga players
Russian Premier League players
Borussia Dortmund players
Hammer SpVg players
Liverpool F.C. players
FC Schalke 04 players
FC Schalke 04 II players
TSV 1860 Munich players
TSV 1860 Munich II players
TuS Koblenz players
Silkeborg IF players
F.C. Copenhagen players
S.V. Zulte Waregem players
SønderjyskE Fodbold players
FC Ufa players
Randers FC players
Karlsruher SC players
Eintracht Braunschweig players
1. FC Kaiserslautern players
Würzburger Kickers players
SV Meppen players
German expatriate footballers
German expatriate sportspeople in England
Expatriate footballers in England
German expatriate sportspeople in Denmark
Expatriate men's footballers in Denmark
German expatriate sportspeople in Belgium
Expatriate footballers in Belgium
German expatriate sportspeople in Russia
Expatriate footballers in Russia